Bilal Aziz Özer (born 1 July 1985) is a professional footballer who plays as a midfielder for Turkish club Kemerspor 2003.

Born in Lebanon, Özer is of Turkish descent and holds German citizenship. He started his senior career in Germany, before moving to Turkey in 2008.

Club career
Özer began his career in Germany. He joined the youth club of TSV Verden, before moving to Schalke 04's youth team. Özer played for the Schalke 04 II side. He then joined VfL Osnabrück, where he played 48 games and scored twice. He scored his first goal for VfL Osnabrück in the DFB-Pokal.

References

External links
 
 

1985 births
Living people
Footballers from Beirut
Lebanese footballers
Turkish footballers
German footballers
Lebanese people of Turkish descent
German people of Turkish descent
Lebanese emigrants to Germany
Association football midfielders
VfL Osnabrück players
FC Schalke 04 II players
Kayserispor footballers
Konyaspor footballers
Kayseri Erciyesspor footballers
Ankaraspor footballers
Fatih Karagümrük S.K. footballers
Eskişehirspor footballers
Süper Lig players
2. Bundesliga players
TFF Second League players
TFF First League players